Shoko Hamada may refer to:

Shoko Hamada (footballer), Japanese women's footballer
Shōko Hamada (television personality), Japanese television personality, gravure idol and race queen